Harrison Township is one of 11 townships in Howard County, Indiana, United States. As of the 2010 census, its population was 9,489 and it contained 4,169 housing units.

Geography

Harrison Township was also one of the only townships in Howard County to grow from 2000 to 2010.

Cities and towns
 Kokomo (southwest edge)

Unincorporated towns
 West Middleton

Former Settlements
 Alto (annexed into Kokomo in 2012)
 Tarkington

Adjacent townships
 Clay Township (north)
 Center Township (northeast)
 Taylor Township (east)
 Liberty Township, Tipton County (southeast)
 Prairie Township, Tipton County (south)
 Honey Creek Township (west)
 Monroe Township (west)

Cemeteries
The township contains two cemeteries: Sunset Memory Gardens and Twin Spring.

Major highways

Airports and landing strips
 Glenndale Airport
 Ruzicka Airport

Recreation

Golf Courses
Chipendale Golf Course, located a mile south of SR 26 on Park Road.
Rice's Golf Center, located on US 31 at Center Road.
Wildcat Creek Golf Course, located in Timbervalley subdivision, entrances on Center Road and SR 26.

Parks
Jackson-Morrow Park, entrances located on Park Road between Alto and Center roads as well as on Webster Street.

Schools
Western High School
Western Middle School
Western Administration Building

Post Offices
West Middleton Post Office, located at the corner of Alto Road and Rabbit Street.
Kokomo Main Post Office, located at the corner of Webster Street and Lincoln Road.

Businesses

Hotels/Bed & Breakfasts
Bavarian Inn Bed & Breakfast, (NWC) Dixon and Center roads

Food
Bavarian Inn Bed & Breakfast, (NWC) Dixon and Center roads
Cone Palace, (SWC) Center Road and US 31
Culver's, (SWC) Pipeline Way and US 31
Golden Corral, (NWC) Center Road and US 31
Grindstone Charley's, located between LaFountain Street and US 31
Half Moon Restaurant and Brewery, (NWC) Pipeline Way and US 31
IHOP, (NWC) Center Road and US 31
Marsh Supermarket, (NWC) LaFountain Street and Southway Boulevard
Mike's Pizza, (SWC) Dixon and Alto roads
Olive Garden, (SWC) LaFountain Street and Haynes Mall Boulevard
Ruby Tuesday, (SWC) Southway Boulevard and US 31
Steak 'n Shake, (NWC) Southway Boulevard and US 31 (near Hospital)
Taco Bell, located between LaFountain Street and US 31
White's Meat Market, (NWC) SR 26 and US 31

Gas
Marsh Gas, (NWC) LaFountain Street and Southway Boulevard
The Alto Express Phillips 66, (NWC) Dixon and Alto roads
Shell Oil Company, (SWC) Center Road and US 31
Speedway, (NEC) Dixon and Alto roads
SuperTest, (NWC) LaFountain Street and Southway Boulevard

Pharmacies
Marsh Supermarket, (NWC) LaFountain Street and Southway Boulevard
Walgreens, (NEC) LaFountain Street and Southway Boulevard

Public Safety
Harrison Township Volunteer Fire Department, 4102 S. Dixon Road

References
 
 United States Census Bureau cartographic boundary files

External links
 Indiana Township Association
 United Township Association of Indiana

Townships in Howard County, Indiana
Kokomo, Indiana metropolitan area
Townships in Indiana